Vultocinus anfractus is a species of crab, the only species in the family Vultocinidae. It has been found around the Philippines, Vanuatu and New Caledonia, and lives on driftwood. Its discovery forced a reappraisal of the relationships within the superfamily Goneplacoidea, and to the recognition of Mathildellidae, Conleyidae and Progeryonidae as separate families.

References

Goneplacoidea
Monotypic arthropod genera